The 1730 Valparaíso earthquake occurred at 04:45 local time (08:45 UTC) on July 8. It had an estimated magnitude of 9.1–9.3 and triggered a major tsunami with an estimated magnitude of  8.75, that inundated the lower parts of Valparaíso.

Tectonic setting
The earthquake took place along the boundary between the Nazca and South American tectonic plates, at a location where they converge at a rate of seventy millimeters a year.

Chile has been at a convergent plate boundary that generates megathrust earthquakes since the Paleozoic (500 million years ago). In historical times the Chilean coast has suffered many megathrust earthquakes along this plate boundary, including the strongest earthquake ever measured. Most recently, the boundary ruptured in 2010 in central Chile.

Damage
The earthquake caused severe damage over a wide area, Valparaíso, Coquimbo, Illapel, Petorca and Tiltil were all affected. The parish church in La Serena was destroyed.

Only a few deaths were recorded due to the earthquake, reportedly because a strong foreshock had caused people to leave their homes. The same is also true for the following tsunami with the inhabitants running to higher ground after seeing the water recede, so that only a few were killed.

Characteristics

Earthquake
At about 01:00 local time in Santiago, there was a strong earthquake, followed by several smaller tremors. The main shock occurred at 4:45 local time.

Tsunami
The tsunami occurred immediately after the mainshock, with a maximum run-up height recorded at Concepción of 16 m. It was also observed at Callao, Peru and in Honshu, Japan where fields were flooded in Rikuzen and the Oshika Peninsula.

See also
List of earthquakes in Chile
List of historical earthquakes

References

Megathrust earthquakes in Chile
Valparaiso earthquake
1730 earthquakes
18th century in Chile
1730 disasters in South America